DSG International may mean:
 DSG International plc is a British retail group, formerly known as Dixons Group plc
 DSG International Ltd. is a manufacturing company based in Hong Kong